Meta Platforms, Inc., doing business as Meta and formerly named Facebook, Inc., and TheFacebook, Inc., is an American multinational technology conglomerate based in Menlo Park, California. The company owns Facebook, Instagram, and WhatsApp, among other products and services. Meta is one of the world's most valuable companies and among the ten largest publicly traded corporations in the United States. It is considered one of the Big Five American information technology companies, alongside Alphabet (Google), Amazon, Apple, and Microsoft.

Meta's products and services include Facebook, Instagram, WhatsApp, Messenger, and Meta Quest. It has acquired Oculus, Mapillary, CTRL-Labs, Kustomer, and has a 9.99% stake in Jio Platforms. In 2021, the company generated 97.5% of its revenue from the sale of advertising.

On October 28, 2021, the parent company of Facebook changed its name from Facebook, Inc., to Meta Platforms, Inc., to "reflect its focus on building the metaverse". According to Meta, the "metaverse" refers to the integrated environment that links all of the company's products and services.

History 

Facebook filed for an initial public offering (IPO) on January 1, 2012. The preliminary prospectus stated that the company sought to raise $5 billion, had 845 million monthly active users, and a website accruing 2.7 billion likes and comments daily. After the IPO, Zuckerberg would retain a 22% ownership share in Facebook and would own 57% of the voting shares.

Underwriters valued the shares at $38 each, valuing the company at $104 billion, the largest valuation to date for a newly public company. On May 16, one day before the IPO, Facebook announced it would sell 25% more shares than originally planned due to high demand. The IPO raised $16 billion, making it the third-largest in US history (slightly ahead of AT&T Wireless and behind only General Motors and Visa). The stock price left the company with a higher market capitalization than all but a few U.S. corporations—surpassing heavyweights such as Amazon, McDonald's, Disney, and Kraft Foods—and made Zuckerberg's stock worth $19 billion. The New York Times stated that the offering overcame questions about Facebook's difficulties in attracting advertisers to transform the company into a "must-own stock". Jimmy Lee of JPMorgan Chase described it as "the next great blue-chip". Writers at TechCrunch, on the other hand, expressed skepticism, stating, "That's a big multiple to live up to, and Facebook will likely need to add bold new revenue streams to justify the mammoth valuation."

Trading in the stock, which began on May 18, was delayed that day due to technical problems with the Nasdaq exchange. The stock struggled to stay above the IPO price for most of the day, forcing underwriters to buy back shares to support the price. At closing bell, shares were valued at $38.23, only $0.23 above the IPO price and down $3.82 from the opening bell value. The opening was widely described by the financial press as a disappointment. The stock nonetheless set a new record for trading volume of an IPO. On May 25, 2012, the stock ended its first full week of trading at $31.91, a 16.5% decline.

On May 22, 2012, regulators from Wall Street's Financial Industry Regulatory Authority announced that they had begun to investigate whether banks underwriting Facebook had improperly shared information only with select clients rather than the general public. Massachusetts Secretary of State William Galvin subpoenaed Morgan Stanley over the same issue. The allegations sparked "fury" among some investors and led to the immediate filing of several lawsuits, one of them a class action suit claiming more than $2.5 billion in losses due to the IPO. Bloomberg estimated that retail investors may have lost approximately $630 million on Facebook stock since its debut. Standard & Poor's added Facebook to its S&P 500 index on December 21, 2013.

On May 2, 2014, Zuckerberg announced that the company would be changing its internal motto from "Move fast and break things" to "Move fast with stable infrastructure". The earlier motto had been described as Zuckerberg's "prime directive to his developers and team" in a 2009 interview in Business Insider, in which he also said, "Unless you are breaking stuff, you are not moving fast enough."

2018—2020: Focus on the metaverse 

Lasso was a short-video sharing app from Facebook similar to TikTok that was launched on iOS and Android in 2018 and was aimed at teenagers. On July 2, 2020, Facebook announced that Lasso would be shutting down July 10.

In 2018, the Oculus lead, Jason Rubin, sent his 50-page vision document titled "The Metaverse" to Facebook's leadership. In the document, Rubin acknowledged that Facebook's virtual reality business had not caught on as expected, despite the hundreds of millions of dollars spent on content for early adopters. He also urged the company to execute fast and invest heavily on the vision, to shut out HTC, Apple, Google and other competitors in the VR space. Regarding other players' participation in the metaverse vision, he called for the company to build the "metaverse" to prevent their competitors from "being in the VR business in a meaningful way at all".

In May 2019, Facebook founded Libra Networks, reportedly to develop their own stablecoin cryptocurrency. Later, it had been reported that Libra was being supported by financial companies such as Visa, Mastercard, PayPal and Uber. The consortium of companies were expected to pool in $10 million each to fund the launch of the cryptocurrency coin named Libra.  Depending on when it would receive approval from the Swiss Financial Market Supervisory authority to operate as a payments service, the Libra Association had planned to launch a limited format cryptocurrency in 2021. Libra was renamed Diem, before being shut down and sold in January 2022 after backlash from government regulators and the public.

During the COVID-19 pandemic, the use of online services including Facebook grew globally. Zuckerberg  predicted this would be a "permanent acceleration" that would continue after the pandemic. Facebook hired aggressively, growing from 48,268 employees in March 2020 to more than 87,000 by September 2022.

2021: Rebrand as Meta 

Following a period of intense scrutiny and damaging whistleblower leaks, news started to emerge on October 21, 2021, about Facebook's plan to rebrand the company and to change its name. In the Q3 2021 Earnings Call, on October 25, Mark Zuckerberg discussed the ongoing criticism of the company's social services and the way it operates, and pointed to the pivoting efforts to building the metaverse – without mentioning the rebranding and the name change. The metaverse vision and the name change from Facebook, Inc. to Meta Platforms was introduced at Facebook Connect on October 28, 2021. Based on Facebook's PR campaign, the name change reflects the company's shifting long term focus of building the metaverse, a digital extension of the physical world by social media, virtual reality and augmented reality features.

"Meta" had been registered as a trademark in the United States in 2018 (after an initial filing in 2015) for marketing, advertising, and computer services, by a Canadian company that provided big data analysis of scientific literature. This company was acquired in 2017 by the Chan Zuckerberg Initiative (CZI), a foundation established by Zuckerberg and his wife Priscilla Chan, and became one of their projects. Following the rebranding announcement, CZI announced that it had already decided to deprioritize the earlier Meta project, that it would be transferring its rights to the name to Meta Platforms, and that the project would end in 2022.

2022–present: Declining profits and mass layoffs 
Soon after the rebranding, in early February 2022, Meta reported a greater-than-expected decline in profits in the fourth quarter of 2021. It reported no growth in monthly users, and indicated it expected revenue growth to stall. The company also expected measures taken by Apple, Inc. to protect user privacy to cost it some $10 billion in advertisement revenue, an amount equal to roughly 8% of its revenue for 2021. In meeting with Meta staff the day after earnings were reported, Zuckerberg blamed competition for user attention, particularly from video-based apps such as TikTok.

The 27% reduction in the company's share price which occurred in reaction to the news eliminated some $230 billion of value from Meta's market capitalization. Bloomberg referred to the decline as "[...] an epic rout that, in its sheer scale, is unlike anything Wall Street or Silicon Valley has ever seen". Zuckerberg's net worth fell by as much as $31 billion. Zuckerberg controls 13% of Meta, and the holding makes up the bulk of his wealth.

According to published reports by Bloomberg News on March 30, 2022, Meta turned over data such as phone numbers, physical addresses, and IP addresses to hackers posing as law enforcement officials using forged documents. The law enforcement requests sometimes included forged signatures of real or fictional officials. When asked about the allegations, a Meta representative said, "We review every data request for legal sufficiency and use advanced systems and processes to validate law enforcement requests and detect abuse."

In June 2022, Sheryl Sandberg, the chief operating officer of 14 years, announced she would step down from the role in the fall of the same year. Zuckerberg stated that Javier Olivan would replace Sandberg, though in a "more traditional" role.

In July 2022, Meta saw its first year-on-year revenue decline when its total revenue slipped by 1% to $28.8bn. Many analysts and journalists accredited the loss to its advertising business, which has been limited by Apple's app tracking transparency feature and the number of people who have opted not to be tracked by Meta apps. Zuckerberg also accredited the decline to increasing competition from TikTok. On October 27, 2022, Meta's market value dropped to $268 billion, a loss of around $700 billion compared to 2021, and its shares fell by 24%. It lost its spot among the top 20 US companies by market cap, despite reaching the top 5 in the previous year.

In November 2022, Meta laid off 11,000 employees, 13% of its workforce. Zuckerberg said the decision to aggressively increase Meta's investments had been a mistake, as he had wrongly predicted that the surge in e-commerce would last beyond the COVID-19 pandemic. He also attributed the decline to increased competition, a global economic downturn and "ads signal loss". The Wall Street Journal characterized the layoffs as part of a general downturn in the tech industry, alongside layoffs by companies including Snap, Twitter and Lyft. The Financial Times reported that further layoffs were likely to take place in March 2023.

Mergers and acquisitions 

Throughout its existence, Facebook, Inc./Meta has acquired multiple companies (often identified as talent acquisitions).

One of its first major acquisitions was in April 2012, when it acquired Instagram for approximately US$1 billion in cash and stock.

In October 2013, Facebook, Inc. acquired Onavo, an Israeli mobile web analytics company.

In February 2014, Facebook, Inc. announced it would buy mobile messaging company WhatsApp for US$19 billion in cash and stock. Later that year, Facebook bought Oculus VR for $2.3 billion in cash and stock, which released its first consumer virtual reality headset in 2016.

In late November 2019, Facebook, Inc. announced the acquisition of the game developer Beat Games, responsible for developing one of that year's most popular VR games, Beat Saber.

In May 2020, Facebook, Inc. announced it had acquired Giphy for a reported cash price of $400 million. It will be integrated with the Instagram team. However, in August 2021, UK's Competition and Markets Authority (CMA) stated that Facebook, Inc. might have to sell Giphy, after an investigation found that the deal between the two companies would harm competition in display advertising market. Facebook, Inc. was fined $70 million by CMA for deliberately failing to report all information regarding the acquisition and the ongoing antitrust investigation. In October 2022, the CMA ruled for a second time that Meta be required to divest Giphy, stating that Meta already controls half of the advertising in the UK. Meta agreed to the sale, though it stated that it disagrees with the decision itself.

In November 2020, Facebook, Inc. announced that it planned to purchase the customer-service platform and chatbot specialist startup Kustomer to promote companies to use their platform for business. It has been reported that Kustomer valued at slightly over $1 billion. The deal was closed in February 2022 after regulatory approval.

In September 2022, Meta acquired Lofelt, a Berlin-based haptic tech startup.

Lobbying 
In 2020, Facebook, Inc. spent  on lobbying, hiring 79 lobbyists. Facebook was the largest spender of lobbying money among the 5 Big Tech companies in 2020. The lobbying team includes top congressional aide, John Branscome, who was hired in September 2021, to help the company fend off threats from Democratic lawmakers and the Biden administration.

Lawsuits 

Numerous lawsuits have been filed against the company, both when it was known as Facebook, Inc., and as Meta Platforms.

In March 2020, the Office of the Australian Information Commissioner (OAIC) sued Facebook, for significant and persistent infringements of the rule on privacy involving the Cambridge Analytica fiasco. Every violation of the Privacy Act is subject to a theoretical cumulative liability of $1.7 million. The OAIC estimated that a total of 311,127 Australians had been exposed.

On December 8, 2020, the U.S. Federal Trade Commission and 46 states (excluding Alabama, Georgia, South Carolina, and South Dakota), the District of Columbia and the territory of Guam, launched Federal Trade Commission v. Facebook as an antitrust lawsuit against Facebook. The lawsuit concerns Facebook's acquisition of two competitors—Instagram and WhatsApp—and the ensuing monopolistic situation. FTC alleges that Facebook holds monopolistic power in the US social networking market and seeks to force the company to divest from Instagram and WhatsApp to break up the conglomerate. William Kovacic, a former chairman of the Federal Trade Commission, argued the case will be difficult to win as it would require the government to create a counterfactual argument of an internet where the Facebook-WhatsApp-Instagram entity did not exist, and prove that harmed competition or consumers.

On December 24, 2021, a court in Russia fined Meta for $27 million after the company declined to remove unspecified banned content. The fine was reportedly tied to the company's annual revenue in the country.

In May 2022, a lawsuit was filed in Kenya against Meta and its local outsourcing company Sama. Allegedly, Meta has poor working conditions in Kenya for workers moderating Facebook posts. The lawsuit seeks financial compensation and an order that outsourced moderators be given the same health benefits and pay scale as Meta employees.

In June 2022, 8 lawsuits were filed across the US over the allege that excessive exposure to platforms including Facebook and Instagram has led to attempted or actual suicides, eating disorders and sleeplessness, among other issues. The litigation follows a former Facebook employee's testimony in Congress that the company refused to take responsibility. The company noted that tools have been developed for parents to keep track of their children's activity on Instagram and set time limits in addition to Meta's "Take a break" reminders. In addition, the company is providing resources specific to eating disorders as well as developing AI to prevent children under the age of 13 signing up for Facebook or Instagram.

In June 2022, Meta settled a lawsuit with the US Department of Justice. The lawsuit, which was filed in 2019, alleged that the company enabled housing discrimination through targeted advertising, as it allowed home owners and landlords to run housing ads excluding people based on sex, race, religion, and other characteristics. The US Department of Justice stated that this was in violation of the Fair Housing Act. Meta was handed a penalty of $115,054 and given until December 31, 2022, to shadow the algorithm tool.

In January 2023, Meta was fined €390 million for violations of the European Union General Data Protection Regulation.

Structure

Management 
Meta's key management consists of:
 Mark Zuckerberg, chairman and chief executive officer
 Javier Olivan, chief operating officer
 Nick Clegg, president, global affairs
 Susan Li, chief financial officer
 Andrew Bosworth, chief technology officer
 David Wehner, chief strategy officer
 Chris Cox, chief product officer
 Marne Levine, chief business officer
 Jennifer Newstead, chief legal officer

, Meta had 83,553 employees worldwide.

Board of directors 
As of January 2022, Meta's board consisted of the following directors;
 Mark Zuckerberg (chairman, founder and chief executive officer)
 Sheryl Sandberg (executive director and chief operating officer)
 Peggy Alford (non-executive director, executive vice president, global sales, PayPal)
 Marc Andreessen (non-executive director, co-founder and general partner, Andreessen Horowitz)
 Drew Houston (non-executive director, chairman and chief executive officer, Dropbox)
 Nancy Killefer (non-executive director, senior partner, McKinsey & Company)
 Robert M. Kimmitt (non-executive director, senior international counsel, WilmerHale)
 Peter Thiel (non-executive director, co-founder and former chief executive officer, PayPal, founder and president, Clarium Capital)
 Tracey Travis (non-executive director, executive vice president, chief financial officer, Estée Lauder Companies)
 Tony Xu (non-executive director, chairman and chief executive officer, DoorDash)

Company governance 
Early Facebook investor and former Zuckerberg mentor Roger McNamee described Facebook as having "the most centralized decision-making structure I have ever encountered in a large company." Nathan Schneider, a professor of media studies at the University of Colorado Boulder argued for transforming Facebook into a platform cooperative owned and governed by the users.

Facebook co-founder Chris Hughes has stated that chief executive officer Mark Zuckerberg has too much power, that the company is now a monopoly, and that, as a result, it should be split into multiple smaller companies. In an op-ed in The New York Times, Hughes said he was concerned that Zuckerberg had surrounded himself with a team that did not challenge him, and that it is the U.S. government's job to hold him accountable and curb his "unchecked power". He also said that "Mark's power is unprecedented and un-American." Several U.S. politicians agreed with Hughes. European Union Commissioner for Competition Margrethe Vestager stated that splitting Facebook should be done only as "a remedy of the very last resort", and that it would not solve Facebook's underlying problems.

Revenue 

Facebook ranked No. 34 in the 2020 Fortune 500 list of the largest United States corporations by revenue, with almost $86 billion in revenue. Most comes from advertising.

According to New York, since its rebranding, Meta has reportedly lost $500 billion as a result of new privacy measures put in place by companies such as Apple and Google which prevents Meta from gathering users' data.

Number of advertisers 
In February 2015, Facebook announced it had reached two million active advertisers, with most of the gain coming from small businesses. An active advertiser was defined as an entity that had advertised on the Facebook platform in the last 28 days. In March 2016, Facebook announced it had reached three million active advertisers with more than 70% from outside the United States. Prices for advertising follow a variable pricing model based on auctioning ad placements, and potential engagement levels of the advertisement itself. Similar to other online advertising platforms like Google and Twitter, targeting of advertisements is one of the chief merits of digital advertising compared to traditional media. Marketing on Meta is employed through two methods based on the viewing habits, likes and shares, and purchasing data of the audience, namely targeted audiences and "look alike" audiences.

Tax affairs 

The US IRS challenged the valuation Facebook used when it transferred IP from the US to Facebook Ireland (now Meta Platforms Ireland) in 2010 (which Facebook Ireland then revalued higher before charging out), as it was building its double Irish tax structure. The case is ongoing and Meta faces a potential fine of $3–5bn.

The US Tax Cuts and Jobs Act of 2017 changed Facebook's global tax calculations. Meta Platforms Ireland is subject to the US GILTI tax of 10.5% on global intangible profits (i.e. Irish profits). On the basis that Meta Platforms Ireland Limited is paying some tax, the effective minimum US tax for Facebook Ireland will be circa 11%. In contrast, Meta Platforms Inc. would incur a special IP tax rate of 13.125% (the FDII rate) if its Irish business relocated to the US. Tax relief in the US (21% vs. Irish at the GILTI rate) and accelerated capital expensing, would make this effective US rate around 12%.

The insignificance of the US/Irish tax difference was demonstrated when Facebook moved 1.5bn non-EU accounts to the US to limit exposure to GDPR.

Facilities

Offices 
Users outside of the US and Canada contract with Meta's Irish subsidiary, Meta Platforms Ireland Limited (formerly Facebook Ireland Limited), allowing Meta to avoid US taxes for all users in Europe, Asia, Australia, Africa and South America. Meta is making use of the Double Irish arrangement which allows it to pay 2–3% corporation tax on all international revenue. In 2010, Facebook opened its fourth office, in Hyderabad, India, which houses online advertising and developer support teams and provides support to users and advertisers. In India, Meta is registered as Facebook India Online Services Pvt Ltd. It also has support centers in Chittagong; Dublin; California; Ireland; and Austin, Texas.

Facebook opened its London headquarters in 2017 in Fitzrovia in central London. Facebook opened an office in Cambridge, Massachusetts in 2018. The offices were initially home to the "Connectivity Lab", a group focused on bringing Internet access to those who do not have access to the Internet. In April 2019, Facebook opened its Taiwan headquarters in Taipei.

In March 2022, Meta opened new regional headquarters in Dubai.

Data centers 
As of 2019, Facebook operated 16 data centers. It committed to purchase 100% renewable energy and to reduce its greenhouse gas emissions 75% by 2020. Its data center technologies include Fabric Aggregator, a distributed network system that accommodates larger regions and varied traffic patterns.

Reception 

US Representative Alexandria Ocasio-Cortez responded in a tweet to Zuckerberg's announcement about Meta, saying: "Meta as in 'we are a cancer to democracy metastasizing into a global surveillance and propaganda machine for boosting authoritarian regimes and destroying civil society ... for profit!

Ex-Facebook employee Frances Haugen and whistleblower behind the Facebook Papers responded to the rebranding efforts by expressing doubts about the company's ability to improve while led by Mark Zuckerberg, and urged the chief executive officer to resign.

In November 2021, a video published by Inspired by Iceland went viral, in which a Zuckerberg look-alike promoted the Icelandverse, a place of "enhanced actual reality without silly looking headsets".

In a December 2021 interview, SpaceX and Tesla chief executive officer Elon Musk said he could not see a compelling use-case for the VR-driven metaverse, adding: "I don't see someone strapping a frigging screen to their face all day."

In January 2022, Louise Eccles of The Sunday Times logged into the metaverse with the intention of making a video guide. She wrote:

Eccles described being sexually harassed by another user, as well as "accents from all over the world, American, Indian, English, Australian, using racist, sexist, homophobic and transphobic language". She also encountered users as young as 7 years old on the platform, despite Oculus headsets being intended for users over 13.

See also 
Big Tech
Criticism of Facebook
Facebook–Cambridge Analytica data scandal
2021 Facebook leak
Meta AI
The Social Network

References

External links 
 
 

 
2004 establishments in Massachusetts
2012 initial public offerings
American companies established in 2004
Companies based in Menlo Park, California
Companies in the Nasdaq-100
Companies in the PRISM network
Companies listed on the Nasdaq
Multinational companies headquartered in the United States
Social media companies of the United States
Software companies based in the San Francisco Bay Area
Technology companies based in the San Francisco Bay Area
Technology companies established in 2004
Virtual reality companies
Organizations designated as terrorist by Russia